SMS S15 was a V1-class torpedo boat of the Imperial German Navy. The ship was built by Schichau-Werke, at their Elbing shipyard, completing in 1912.

S15 served in the North Sea and English Channel during the First World War, taking part in the Battle of Jutland in 1916. She was badly damaged by a mine on 21 August 1917 and was scrapped as a result.

Construction and design
In 1911, the Imperial German Navy decided to break the pattern of each year's orders of torpedo boats being a development of the previous year's designs, as it felt that they were getting too big to work for the fleet, and instead the 12 torpedo boats (six each ordered from AG Vulcan and Germaniawerft) (the V1-class) were smaller than those ordered in recent years in order to be more manoeuvrable and so work better with the fleet. This change resulted in the numbering series for torpedo boats being restarted. The 1912 programme placed orders for a flotilla of 12 torpedo boats of similar design ( to ) with Schichau-Werke. The reduction in size resulted in the ships' seaworthiness being adversely affected, however, with the 1911 and 1912 torpedo boats acquiring the disparaging nickname "Admiral Lans' cripples".

S15s armament consisted of two  SK L/30 naval guns in single mounts fore and aft, together with four 50 cm (19.7 in) torpedo tubes with one reload torpedo carried. Up to 18 mines could be carried. The ship had a crew of 74 officers and other ranks. In 1916, the guns were replaced by more powerful 8.8 cm SK L/45 naval guns, and in 1917, these guns were again replaced, this time with 10.5 cm SK L/45 naval guns, while the ship's forecastle was lengthened.

S15, yard number 866, was launched at Schichau's shipyard in Elbing, East Prussia (now Elbląg in Poland) on 23 March 1912 and was commissioned on 1 November 1912.

Service
S15 was a member of the 13th Half-flotilla of the 7th Torpedo boat flotilla of the German High Seas Fleet on the outbreak of war. The 7th Torpedo Boat Flotilla supported the Raid on Yarmouth on 3 November 1914 and the Raid on Scarborough, Hartlepool and Whitby on 16 December 1914. Argo rammed S22 and made off, ignoring a warning shot over her boxs, with the two torpedo boats not opening fire as the commanding officer was unsure whether they were in Swedish territorial waters. Argo was seized at Utlängan in Swedish waters, and taken to the German port of Swinemünde (now Świnoujście in Poland) but was released after a few hours. S15, as part of the 7th flotilla, was part of the High Seas Fleet when it sailed to cover the Lowestoft Raid on 24–25 April 1916.

At the Battle of Jutland on 31 May–1 June 1916, S15 was still part of the 13th Half-flotilla of the 7th Torpedo boat flotilla, operating in support of the main German battle fleet. During the night action, the 7th flotilla was ordered to search for and attack the British fleet. At about 23:00 hr CET (i.e. 22:00 hr GMT) on the night of 31 May/1 June, there was a brief confrontation between the 7th Torpedo Boat flotilla and the British 4th Destroyer Flotilla. Four German torpedo boats, including S15, each fired one torpedo at the British destroyers, while the British ships replied with gunfire, but no ships were damaged and contact was soon lost, although the two formations met again at about 23:42 CET (22:42 GMT) when  fired another torpedo, which also missed.

In February 1917, S15 was one of ten torpedo boats that were transferred to the German naval forces based in Flanders, arriving in Belgium on 18 February, joining the 2nd Zeebrugge half-flotilla. On the night of March 17/18 1917 the Germans launched a major raid by the Flanders-based torpedo boats against Allied defences and shipping in the English Channel. While two groups of torpedo boats, the seven ships of the 6th Flotilla and the five ships of the 1st Zeebrugge half-flotilla were to operate against the Dover Barrage, S15 led three more torpedo boats of the 2nd Zeebrugge half flotilla that were ordered to attack shipping on the Downs. Only a single merchant ship, the steamer , which was suffering from engine problems was anchored in the Downs. S15 and  each fired a single torpedo at Greypoint, - S15s torpedo missed, but S20s torpedo sunk the steamer. The four torpedo boats then attacked the drifters again, damaging the  before firing a few shells at Ramsgate, Broadstairs and St Peter's before withdrawing. The torpedo boats of the 6th flotilla sank the British destroyer  and badly damaged the destroyer .

On 5 June 1917, the British Dover Patrol, supported by the Harwich Force carried out a bombardment of the port of Ostend. On the morning of that day, S15 and S20 were returning from a patrol when they encountered four light cruisers and nine destroyers of the Harwich Force. The British opened fire on the two German torpedo boats, which made for port. Four British destroyers (and ) were ordered to intercept the German ships. Four of S15s crew were killed.

On 21 August 1917, S15 was escorting minesweepers off the coast of Flanders when she was badly damaged by a mine. She was towed back to port by S24 but was stricken on 20 September 1917 and scrapped at Ghent.

Notes

References

Bibliography

 

 
 
 

 

Torpedo boats of the Imperial German Navy
1912 ships
World War I torpedo boats of Germany
V1-class destroyers
Ships built in Elbing
Ships built by Schichau